Rosie Molloy Gives Up Everything is a comedy drama series, written and created by English screenwriter Susan Nickson. It starts Sheridan Smith, Ardal O'Hanlon and Pauline McLynn. All six episodes were released on 7 December 2022 on Sky Comedy and Now.

Cast
 Sheridan Smith as Rosie Molloy
 Ardal O'Hanlon as Conall Molloy
 Pauline McLynn as Win Molloy
 Lewis Reeves as Joey Molloy
 Oliver Wellington as Nico
 Adelle Leonce as Ruby
 Leah MacRae as Monica

Episodes

Reception 
Stuart Jeffries of The Guardian said, "It’s gags galore in Sheridan Smith’s hilarious new comedy. The actor’s captivating turn as an out-of-control hedonist has a script stuffed with jokes." Carol Midgley of The Times agreed, writing, "Some vehicles work better for Sheridan Smith than others, but Rosie Molloy Gives Up Everything is a rocket for her talent," concluding, "Its irreverence probably won’t please some. Rosie Molloy is a mess, but a damn funny one." Sean O'Grady of The Independent praised the series' "great deal of dramatic tension", noting, "It’s comical, in the darkest kind of way. In Smith’s spirited (no pun intended) performance, our Rosie is a kind of engaging Mancunian good-time girl who’ll try anything once – and then get addicted to it."

References

Entertainment
British comedy